Sphinx is a 1981 American adventure film directed by Franklin J. Schaffner and starring Lesley-Anne Down and Frank Langella. The screenplay by John Byrum is based on the 1979 novel of the same name by Robin Cook.

Plot
Dedicated Egyptologist Erica Baron is researching a paper about the chief architect to Pharaoh Seti. Soon after her arrival in Cairo, she witnesses the brutal murder of unscrupulous art dealer Abdu-Hamdi, meets Yvon Mageot, a French journalist, and is befriended by Akmed Khazzan, who heads the antiquities division of the United Nations. When she journeys to the Valley of the Kings in Luxor to search a tomb reportedly filled with treasures, she finds herself the target of black marketeers determined to keep the riches for themselves.

Cast
 Lesley-Anne Down as Erica Baron 
 Frank Langella as Akmed Khazzan 
 Maurice Ronet as Yvon Mageot
 John Gielgud as Abdu-Hamdi
 Vic Tablian as Khalifa 
 Martin Benson as Mohammed 
 John Rhys-Davies as Stephanos Markoulis
 Nadim Sawalha as Gamal
 Tutte Lemkow as Tewfik 
 Saeed Jaffrey as Selim
 Eileen Way as Aida 
 William Hootkins as  Don 
 James Cossins as Lord Carnarvon 
 Victoria Tennant as Lady Carnarvon
 Behrouz Vossoughi as Menephta, The Royal Architect

Production
Film rights were purchased by Orion Pictures for $1 million.

Schaffner said in 1981, "I've never done this kind of film before, this mixture of mystery and adventure and romance. Two years ago, when I considered taking on the project, it seemed to me that audiences would look for this kind of escapist entertainment when it was released. I sincerely hope I'm right."

Interiors were filmed in Budapest. Egypt locations include the Cairo bazaars, Giza, the Winter Palace Hotel in Luxor, and Thebes. The tomb set cost $1 million.

Lesley-Anne Down got married during the filming.

Critical reception
Vincent Canby of The New York Times said the film "never stops talking and never does it make a bit of sense. It's unhinged. If it were a person, and you were trying to be nice, you might say it wasn't itself." He continued, "Mr. Schaffner and Mr. Byrum have effectively demolished what could have possibly been a decently absurd archeological-adventure film. The locations . . . are so badly and tackily used that the movie could have been shot more economically in Queens . . . The performers are terrible, none more so than Mr. Langella, who is supposed to be mysterious and romantic but behaves with all of the charm of a room clerk at the Nile Hilton." In conclusion, he called the film "total, absolute, utter confusion."
 
Variety described the film as a contemporary version of The Perils of Pauline and called it "an embarrassment," adding "Franklin J. Schaffner's steady and sober style is helpless in the face of the mounting implausibilities."

Time Out New York thought the film made "striking use of locations" but criticized the "lousy script, uneasy heroine, and weak material." It called it a "clear case of a lame project that only a best selling (ie. heavily pre-sold) novel could have financed" and warned audiences to "avoid" it.

References

External links
 
 
 
 
 
 

1981 films
1980s adventure films
American adventure films
Films based on American novels
Films set in Egypt
Films directed by Franklin J. Schaffner
Orion Pictures films
Warner Bros. films
1980s English-language films
1980s American films